Sultan Baig is an Indian politician and a member of the Sixteenth Legislative Assembly of Uttar Pradesh in India. He represented the Meerganj constituency of Uttar Pradesh and is a member of the Samajwadi party political party.

Early life and  education
Sultan Baig was born on January 1, 1957, in Uttar Pradesh. He attained a master of science (agriculture) post-graduation from G. B. Pant University of Agriculture and Technology, Uttrakhand.

Political  career
Sultan Baig has been a MLA for three terms. He represented the Meerganj constituency and is a member of the Samajwadi Party political party.

Posts held

See also
 Meerganj (Assembly constituency)
 Sixteenth Legislative Assembly of Uttar Pradesh
 Uttar Pradesh Legislative Assembly

References 

Bahujan Samaj Party politicians from Uttar Pradesh
Uttar Pradesh MLAs 2002–2007
Uttar Pradesh MLAs 2007–2012
Uttar Pradesh MLAs 2012–2017
21st-century Indian Muslims
People from Bareilly district
1957 births
Living people